Brett Randell (born 20 May 1995) is a New Zealand cricketer. He made his List A debut for Northern Districts on 18 January 2017 in the 2016–17 Ford Trophy. Prior to his List A debut, he was part of New Zealand's squad for the 2014 Under-19 Cricket World Cup.

He made his first-class debut for Northern Districts on 21 March 2017 in the 2016–17 Plunket Shield season. He made his Twenty20 debut for Northern Districts in the 2017–18 Super Smash on 15 December 2017. In June 2018, he was awarded a contract with Northern Districts for the 2018–19 season.

References

External links
 

1995 births
Living people
New Zealand cricketers
Northern Districts cricketers
Place of birth missing (living people)